Italy competed at the 1924 Winter Olympics in Chamonix, France.

Bobsleigh

Cross-country skiing

Men

Military patrol

Ski jumping

References

 Olympic Winter Games 1924, full results by sports-reference.com

Nations at the 1924 Winter Olympics
1924
Olympics, Winter